The rock monitor (Varanus albigularis) is a species of monitor lizard in the family Varanidae. The species is endemic to Central, East, and southern Africa. It is the second-longest lizard found on the continent, and the heaviest-bodied; locally, it is called leguaan or likkewaan.

Taxonomy
First described by François Marie Daudin in 1802, V. albigularis has been classified as a subspecies of V. exanthematicus, but has since been declared a distinct species based upon differences in hemipenal morphology.  The generic name Varanus is derived from the Arabic word waral ورل, which is translated to English as "monitor".  The specific name albigularis comes from a compound of two Latin words: albus meaning "white" and gula meaning "throat".

The subspecies of V. albigularis are:
White-throated monitor, V. a. albigularis 
Angolan white-throated monitor, V. a. angolensis
Eastern white-throated monitor, V. a. microstictus
Black-throated monitor, V. a. ionidesi   (but may be synonymous with V. a. microstictus)

Description
Large mature males can attain . It is the second longest African lizard after the Nile monitor (Varanus niloticus). Varanus albigularis reaches  in total length (including tail), with its tail and body being of equal size. However, they rarely exceed 100-150cm in many areas. Mature specimens more typically will measure . The head and neck are the same length, and are distinct from each other. The bulbous, convex snout gives an angular, box-like appearance. The forked tongue is pink or bluish,  and the body scales are usually a mottled gray-brown with yellowish or white markings.

Geographic range and habitat
V. albigularis is found in Central Africa (Democratic Republic of the Congo/Zaire), Southern Africa (Namibia, Botswana, Republic of South Africa, Eswatini, Zimbabwe, Mozambique, Zambia, Angola), the African Great Lakes (Kenya, Uganda, Tanzania), and the Horn of Africa (Ethiopia, Somalia). V. albigularis is found in a variety of dry habitats, including steppes, prairies, and savannahs, but is absent from desert interiors, rainforests, and thick scrub forests.

Diet 
V. albigularis are generalists, feeding opportunistically on a broad variety of prey in the wild, such as other lizards, amphibians, birds, snakes, tortoises, eggs and small mammals. Tortoises make up a significant part of their diet, and are swallowed whole due to the hard shell. Otherwise, this species consumes very little vertebrate prey, eating primarily invertebrates, especially millipedes, beetles, molluscs, orthopterans and scorpions. Millipedes for example form nearly a quarter of their diet; the monitors are apparently resistant to its poisonous secretions. They are not averse to occasionally scavenging the corpses of vertebrate prey, even those as large as vervet monkeys, which are sometimes torn to pieces by "death rolling" like a crocodilian prior to consumption. Live vertebrate prey other than tortoises are usually too fast to catch for these monitors, and therefore form very little of their diet. This contrasts with what is often a diet of mostly vertebrates in captivity, such as rodents, poultry or fish.

Predator 
Natural predators of adult rock monitors include martial eagles and leopard.

Intelligence
An intelligent lizard, several specimens of V. albigularis have demonstrated the ability to count as high as six in an experiment conducted by Dr. John Philips at the San Diego Zoo in 1999.  Philips offered varying numbers of snails, and the monitors were able to distinguish numbers whenever one was missing.

Folklore
People living with the HIV/AIDS virus in Yumbe District of Uganda have been reported injecting themselves with the blood of rock monitors, which they believe to be a cure for the virus. Many are reportedly discontinuing anti-retroviral therapy to pursue this anecdotal treatment.

As a result, V. albigularis is reported to have become an expensive item in the Ugandan black market, selling for more than 175 US$ each.

References

External links
Photo of Varanus albigularis

Further reading
Bayless, Mark K. (1992). "The Necropsy and internal Anatomy of a white-throated monitor lizard (Varanus albigularis Daudin, 1802)". VaraNews 2 (1): 5-6.

Varanus
Reptiles described in 1802
Taxa named by François Marie Daudin